Proclamation 10043 is a presidential proclamation signed by Donald Trump, the 45th US president, on May 29, 2020, in order to prohibit students in the People's Republic of China associated with the People's Liberation Army from obtaining F visas or J visas.

Effect

As was reported by Reuters in Sep 2020, visas of more than 1,000 Chinese students had been canceled. In June 2021, a survey of 310 students showed that most of students who had been rejected studied at one of the following eight universities: Beihang University, Beijing Institute of Technology, Harbin Institute of Technology, Harbin Engineering University, Northwestern Polytechnical University, Nanjing University of Aeronautics and Astronautics, Nanjing University of Science and Technology and Beijing University of Posts and Telecommunications, or was funded by China Scholarship Council.

Response
The Ministry of Foreign Affairs of the People's Republic of China strongly opposed the limitation on Chinese international students and have lodged solemn representations with the US.

Some students planned to contacting lawyers to initiate a class action lawsuit. They also hosted a website called 10043.org to share their experiences.

On June 10, 2021, Association of American Universities, American Council of Education and 39 other associations sent a letter to the United States Department of State asking them to explain the scope of Proclamation 10043.

References 

Proclamations
Presidency of Donald Trump
Visa policy of the United States
China–United States relations